Heather Steacy (born April 14, 1988 in Saskatoon, Saskatchewan) is a Canadian track and field athlete competing in the hammer throw. She competed in the hammer throw event at the 2012 Summer Olympics where she finished 34th. She is the younger sister of Canadian Olympic hammer thrower James Steacy.

In July 2016 she was officially named to Canada's Olympic team.  She finished in 23rd place.

During the University of Lethbridge's 50th anniversary, Heather Steacy was named #7 Pronghorn of all time, recognizing not only her Olympic success, but also her 2 time win of the prestigious Pronghorn of the Year award.

Achievements
 1st, 2012 and 2016 National Championships, Calgary, Canada (Olympic "A" Standard).
 14th, q., 2011 IAAF World Championships in Athletics, Dague, South Korea.
 Personal Best: 72.16;  Tempe, AZ, 4 June 2012

References

External links
 
 
 Heather Steacy at All-Athletics.ca

1988 births
Living people
Athletes (track and field) at the 2012 Summer Olympics
Athletes (track and field) at the 2016 Summer Olympics
Canadian female hammer throwers
Olympic track and field athletes of Canada
Athletes from Saskatoon
Athletes (track and field) at the 2015 Pan American Games
Pan American Games track and field athletes for Canada